In the mathematical field of topology, a regular homotopy refers to a special kind of homotopy between immersions of one manifold in another. The homotopy must be a 1-parameter family of immersions.

Similar to homotopy classes, one defines two immersions to be in the same regular homotopy class if there exists a regular homotopy between them. Regular homotopy for immersions is similar to isotopy of embeddings: they are both restricted types of homotopies. Stated another way, two continuous functions  are homotopic if they represent points in the same path-components of the mapping space , given the compact-open topology.

Examples 
Any two knots in 3-space are equivalent by regular homotopy, though not by isotopy.
The Whitney–Graustein theorem  classifies the regular homotopy classes of a circle into the plane; two immersions are regularly homotopic if and only if they have the same turning number – equivalently, total curvature; equivalently, if and only if their Gauss maps have the same degree/winding number.

Stephen Smale classified the regular homotopy classes of a k-sphere immersed in   – they are classified by homotopy groups of Stiefel manifolds, which is a generalization of the Gauss map, with here k partial derivatives not vanishing. In case  we have . In particular, spheres  embedded in  admit eversion if . In particular, this means that sphere eversions exist, i.e. one can turn the 2-sphere "inside-out".

Both of these examples consist of reducing regular homotopy to homotopy; this has subsequently been substantially generalized in the homotopy principle (or h-principle) approach.

Non-degenerate homotopy

For locally convex, closed space curves, one can also define non-degenerate homotopy. Here, the 1-parameter family of immersions must be non-degenerate (i.e. the curvature may never vanish). There are 2 distinct non-degenerate homotopy classes. Further restrictions of non-vanishing torsion lead to 4 distinct equivalence classes.

References

 
 
 

Differential topology
Algebraic topology